Dmytro Viktorovych Khovbosha (born 5 February 1989) is a professional Ukrainian football defender.

External links
 
 
 
 
 Profile at FC Zorya Luhanske (archived) 

1989 births
Living people
Ukrainian footballers
FC Zorya Luhansk players
FC Stal Alchevsk players
FC Naftovyk-Ukrnafta Okhtyrka players
FC Shakhtar Sverdlovsk players
FC Stal Kamianske players
FC Kremin Kremenchuk players
Ukrainian Premier League players
Armenian Premier League players
Expatriate footballers in Armenia
Ukrainian expatriate footballers
Ukrainian expatriate sportspeople in Armenia
FC Alashkert players
FC Kramatorsk players
FC Urartu players
NK Veres Rivne players
Association football defenders
Ukrainian Second League players
Sportspeople from Luhansk Oblast